Matteo Cairoli (born 1 June 1996) is an Italian racing driver who currently competes in the FIA World Endurance Championship.

Career

Junior formula
Cairoli began his single-seater racing career in 2012, competing in the Italian Formula Renault Championship. He would finish the season 13th in points after competing in the final four races, scoring one podium. After a 2013 season in which he competed in the German Formula Three Championship, Cairoli joined GSK Grand Prix for the 2014 Formula Renault 2.0 Alps Series season. However, he would only compete in the first round at Imola before leaving the team.

Sports cars
After competing in junior formula competition, Cairoli moved to sports cars in 2014, taking part in the Porsche Carrera Cup Italia with Antonelli Motorsport. It was a successful first season, as Cairoli took the series title by 70 points, winning six of the fourteen races. As a result, he was invited to compete for the Porsche International Cup Scholarship, which he won, receiving €200,000 and Porsche Junior driver status for 2015. As part of the 2015 Porsche Junior driver class, Cairoli was awarded a seat in the Porsche Supercup and Porsche Carrera Cup Germany for that season, signing with Project 1 Motorsport in both series. At the end of 2016, following a second-placed points finish in the 2016 Porsche Supercup, Cairoli was further promoted in the Porsche system to "Young Professional" status.

In 2017, Cairoli stepped up to compete for Dempsey-Proton Racing in the LMGTE Am class of the FIA World Endurance Championship. The opportunity provided Cairoli with his first appearance at the 24 Hours of Le Mans, where the team finished sixth in class. In his first season with the team, the team finished second in the LMGTE Am class, winning twice at the Nürburgring and in Mexico City. Cairoli also competed with Dempsey-Proton in the European Le Mans Series for 2017, scoring a class victory at Portimão as the team finished third in points. Ahead of the 2019–20 FIA World Endurance Championship, Cairoli returned to Team Project 1.

In February 2020, Cairoli signed with Dinamic Motorsport to compete in the GT World Challenge Europe Endurance Cup. The following season, Cairoli featured as part of the Manthey Racing team that claimed overall victory at the 24 Hours of Nürburgring, driving alongside Kévin Estre and Michael Christensen.

Racing record

Career summary

* Season still in progress.

Complete FIA World Endurance Championship results
(key) (Races in bold indicate pole position; races in italics indicate fastest lap)

Complete WeatherTech SportsCar Championship results
(key) (Races in bold indicate pole position)

Complete 24 Hours of Le Mans results

References

External links
Matteo Cairoli at the Porsche Newsroom
Matteo Cairoli at Motorsport.com

1996 births
Living people
Italian racing drivers
24 Hours of Daytona drivers
24 Hours of Le Mans drivers
WeatherTech SportsCar Championship drivers
Formula Renault 2.0 Alps drivers
Porsche Supercup drivers
Italian F4 Championship drivers
24H Series drivers
European Le Mans Series drivers
ADAC GT Masters drivers
FIA World Endurance Championship drivers
Blancpain Endurance Series drivers
Porsche Motorsports drivers
German Formula Three Championship drivers
Nürburgring 24 Hours drivers
Porsche Carrera Cup Germany drivers
Asian Le Mans Series drivers
Iron Lynx drivers